This is a list of the fastest circumnavigation, made by a person or team, excluding orbits of Earth from spacecraft.

List

Other categories

See also

List of circumnavigations

References

Circumnavigations
Cicumnavigations
 
World records